Allentown is a neighborhood of Tukwila, Washington, on the Duwamish River.  It is situated between the Rainier View neighborhood of southern Seattle and the Boulevard Park neighborhood of unincorporated King County.

History

The area was settled by Joseph Allen, for whom the area is named, in 1879.

References

Neighborhoods in King County, Washington